23 Pashons - Coptic calendar - 25 Pashons

Fixed commemorations

All fixed commemorations below are observed on 24 Pashons (1 June) by the Coptic Orthodox Church

Feasts
 Feast of the Entry of Christ in Egypt (one of the seven minor feasts)

Saints
 Prophet Habakkuk
 Saint Bashnouna (880 A.M.), (1164 A.D.)

References
Coptic Synexarion

Days of the Coptic calendar